The automotive industry in Turkey plays an important role in the manufacturing sector of the Turkish economy. The companies operating in the Turkish automotive sector are mainly located in the Marmara Region.

In 2021 Turkey produced 1,276,140 motor vehicles, ranking as the 13th largest producer in the world (production peaked at 1,695,731 motor vehicles in 2017, when Turkey also ranked 13th). Turkish automotive companies like TEMSA, Otokar and BMC are among the world's largest van, bus and truck manufacturers. Togg, or Turkey's Automobile Joint Venture Group Inc. is the first all-electric vehicle company of Turkey. With a cluster of car-makers and parts suppliers, the Turkish automotive sector has become an integral part of the global network of production bases, exporting nearly $20 billion worth of motor vehicles and components. In 2017 nearly 85% of exports went to Europe. Global car manufacturers with production plants include Fiat/Tofaş, Oyak-Renault, Hyundai, Toyota, Honda and Ford/Otosan.

The foundations of the industry were laid in the 1950s when TOE (Türk Otomotiv Endüstrileri A.Ş.) started producing REO military truck and later trucks by International Harvester. A brief foray in car production was stopped short. In 1961 the first domestic car Devrim was made by a train manufacturer TÜLOMSAŞ. With the establishment of the Otosan assembly factory in 1959, mass production of the domestic car Anadol started in 1966.

History

In 1929 the first car was assembled in Istanbul by Ford Motor Company. 48 cars were produced daily. However, production ended due to the Great Depression of the 1930s.

In 1954 the Jeep factory was established for the production of Turkey's Willys-Overland vehicles in Tuzla, Turkey.

In 1959 the Otosan factory was established in Istanbul to produce the models of the Ford Motor Company under licence in Turkey. Production of the Ford Consul at the Otosan factory began in 1960.

In 1961 the Devrim sedan was manufactured at the Tülomsaş factory in Eskişehir. It was the first indigenously designed and produced Turkish automobile.

In 1964 the production of the Austin and Morris vehicles of the British Motor Corporation began at the BMC factory in İzmir. The BMC brand was later fully acquired by Turkey's Çukurova Group in 1989, which currently produces all BMC models in the world.

In 1966 Anadol became the first mass-produced Turkish automobile brand. All Anadol models were produced by the Otosan factory in Istanbul.

In 1968 the Tofaş factory was opened in Bursa for producing Fiat models under licence.

In 1969 the Oyak-Renault factory was established in Bursa for producing Renault models.

Other global automotive manufacturers such as Toyota, Honda, Opel, Hyundai, Mercedes-Benz and MAN Truck & Bus produce automobiles, vans, buses and trucks in their Turkish factories. There are also a number of Turkish bus and truck brands, such as BMC, Otokar and TEMSA.

By 2004, Turkey was exporting 518,000 vehicles a year, mostly to the European Union member states.

In 2006, the European Investment Bank loaned Tofaş €175 million to jointly develop and produce with PSA Peugeot Citroën and Fiat Auto small commercial vehicles for the European market. The loan, part-financing for total investments estimated at €400 million, was intended to result in an important expansion of the company's production capabilities and create around 5,000 new jobs. The vehicles will be produced at the manufacturing plant of Tofaş in Bursa with an additional, initial, annual capacity of 135.000 cars, due to roll off the assembly line in late 2007.

The first official introduction of Etox Zafer took place on 30 August 2007.

Like in many countries, the car manufacturing industry has been significantly affected by the global financial crisis. In March 2009, Turkey's Automotive Industry Association (OSD) said the automotive production fell by 63% on year in the first two months of 2009, as exports dropped by 61.6% in the same period.

In 2019, the high automotive export figures were boosted by the substantial increase in sales to the Netherlands and the U.S., which saw a rise of 131% and 55%, respectively. According to Uludağ Automotive Industry Exporters.

Manufacturers

Active
 BMC
 Bora
 Diardi
 Erkunt
 Etox
 FNSS Defence Systems
 Ford Otosan
 Honda
 Hyundai
 Isuzu
 Karsan
 Kral
 Onuk
 Otokar
 Oyak-Renault
 Pilotcar
 TEMSA
 Tofaş
 TOGG
 Toyota
 Volkicar

Defunct
 Anadol
 Askam
 Devrim
 EVT Motor
 Imza
 Otokar Renault Véhicules Industriels
 Otoser
 Özaltın

Production

In 2021 Turkey produced 1,276,140 motor vehicles, ranking as the 13th largest producer in the world. 

Annual production in Turkey had earlier peaked at 1,695,731 motor vehicles in 2017, when the country also ranked 13th in the world.

Turkey produced 1,124,982 motor vehicles in 2010, ranking as the 7th largest automotive producer in Europe; behind Germany (5,819,614), France (3,174,260), Spain (2,770,435), the United Kingdom (1,648,388), Russia (1,508,358) and Italy (1,211,594), respectively.

In 2008 Turkey produced 1,147,110 motor vehicles, ranking as the 6th largest producer in Europe (behind the United Kingdom and above Italy) and the 15th largest producer in the world.

The combined capacity of the 6 companies producing passenger cars stood at 726,000 units per year in 2002, reaching 991,621 units per year in 2006. In 2002, Fiat/Tofaş had 34% of this capacity, Oyak/Renault 31%, Hyundai/Assan and Toyota 14% each, Honda 4%, and Ford/Otosan 3%.

With a cluster of car-makers and parts suppliers, the Turkish automotive sector has become an integral part of the global network of production bases, exporting over $22,944,000,000 worth of motor vehicles and components in 2008.

Domestic Turkish car

Existing diesel vehicles cause air pollution in Turkey. On 2 November 2017, Turkey announced that five Turkish companies, under coordination by the Union of Chambers and Commodity Exchanges of Turkey, decided to take part in the consortium for domestically-made EV production, which was established in 2018 with the name Togg. The first prototypes, designed by Pininfarina, were presented to the media in 2019 and commercial sales are scheduled to begin by 2022.

The electric cars will be produced in five models (C-segment hatchback, C-segment sedan, C-segment MPV, C-segment SUV and B-segment SUV) and the initial production rate will be 175,000 vehicles per annum. Production may not be enough to avoid the risk to the economy of Turkey of high oil import bills in the mid-2020s.

The Togg consortium includes the following Turkish companies:
 Anadolu Group
 BMC
 Kıraça Holding
 Turkcell
 Vestel

2 and 3 wheelers 

Turkey manufactures electric bicycles, escooters and 3 wheelers.

Lorries 
Electric lorries are produced.

Batteries
Despite large reserves of amorphous graphite not enough is mined and there are missing links in processing it into negative electrodes (sometimes called anodes).

Charging network
, although the public charging network has enough fast DC charging for the Istanbul Ankara motorway, it is sparse or non-existent in many other parts of the country, but would be technically easy to expand.

Economics 
 the special consumption tax(Turkish) – a sales tax on luxuries, such as private cars – is 

 Up to 85 kW motor - 60%
 85 kW to 120 kW - 150%
 120 kW and over 220%

See also
 List of companies of Turkey
 Automotive industry
 Economy of Turkey

References

Industry in Turkey
Turkey